The 1988 NCAA Division I-AA Football Championship Game was a postseason college football game between the Georgia Southern Eagles and the Furman Paladins. The game was played on December 17, 1988, at Holt Arena in Pocatello, Idaho. The culminating game of the 1988 NCAA Division I-AA football season, it was won by Furman, 17–12.

Teams
The participants of the Championship Game were the finalists of the 1988 I-AA Playoffs, which began with a 16-team bracket.

Georgia Southern Eagles

Georgia Southern finished their regular season with a 9–2 record; one of their losses was to Florida State of Division I-A. Ranked second in the final NCAA I-AA in-house poll and seeded second in the tournament, the Eagles defeated The Citadel, Stephen F. Austin, and Eastern Kentucky to reach the final. This was the third appearance for Georgia Southern in a Division I-AA championship game, having won in 1985 and 1986.

Furman Paladins

Furman also finished their regular season with a 9–2 record (6–1 in conference); one of their losses was to Clemson of Division I-A. Ranked fourth in the final NCAA I-AA in-house poll and seeded fourth in the tournament, the Paladins defeated Delaware, Marshall, and top-seed Idaho to reach the final. This was the second appearance for Furman in a Division I-AA championship game, having lost to Georgia Southern in 1985.

Game summary

Scoring summary

Game statistics

References

Further reading

External links
 1988 I-AA National Championship - Furman vs Ga. Southern via YouTube

Championship Game
NCAA Division I Football Championship Games
Furman Paladins football games
Georgia Southern Eagles football games
American football in Idaho
Sports in Pocatello, Idaho
Sports competitions in Idaho
NCAA Division I-AA Football Championship Game
NCAA Division I-AA Football Championship Game